Enakku Nane Needipathi is a 1986 Tamil-language action drama film,  directed by S. A. Chandrasekhar and produced by Kovai Chezhiyan. The film stars Vijayakanth, Jeevitha, Jaishankar and Lakshmi.

Cast
Vijayakanth
Jeevitha
Jaishankar
Lakshmi
Major Sundarrajan
Vinu Chakravarthy
Senthil
Anuradha

Soundtrack
The music was composed by Ilaiyaraaja.

References

External links
 
 

1986 films
Films scored by Ilaiyaraaja
1980s Tamil-language films
Films directed by S. A. Chandrasekhar